Salala District is one of eight districts in Bong County, Liberia.  Multiple internally displaced person camps are located in the district.

References 

Districts of Liberia
Bong County